The lark sparrow (Chondestes grammacus) is a fairly large New World sparrow. It is the only member of the genus Chondestes.

Distribution and habitat
It breeds in southern Canada, much of the United States, and northern Mexico. It is much less common in the east, where its range is contracting. The populations in Mexico and adjacent states of the United States are resident, but other birds are migratory, wintering in the southern United States, Mexico and south to Guatemala.

It is a very rare vagrant to western Europe, with two accepted records in Great Britain in 1981 and 1991.

Description

The lark sparrow is distinctive. Adults have a typically sparrow-like dark-streaked brown back, and white underparts except for a dark central spot. The cheeks and crown sides are chestnut, with white eyebrow and crown stripes. The dark tail's corners are also white. Young lark sparrows are duller, and the underparts are streaked.

Measurements:

 Length: 5.9-6.7 in (15-17 cm)
 Weight: 0.8-1.2 oz (24-33 g)
 Wingspan: 11.0 in (28 cm)

Diet and behaviour
They forage on the ground or in low bushes. They mainly eat seeds, but insects, including grasshoppers, are also eaten in the breeding season. They form flocks on migration or in winter.

Breeding
The breeding habitat is a variety of open habitats including grasslands and cultivation. Lark sparrows nest on the ground, laying three to six eggs in a grass cup nest sheltered by a clump of grass or other vegetation. The eggs are white with black scrawling.

Call
The song is two clear notes followed by a mixture of buzzes and trills. The flight call is a thin sit.

References

Buntings and Sparrows by Byers, Olsson and Curson,

Further reading

Book
 Martin, J. W., and J. R. Parrish. 2000. Lark Sparrow (Chondestes grammacus). In The Birds of North America, No. 488 (A. Poole and F. Gill, eds.). The Birds of North America, Inc., Philadelphia, PA.

Thesis
 Grigore MT. Ph.D. (1999). Breeding ecology and nest site selection in the eastern lark sparrow (Chondestes grammacus grammacus Say) at the edge of its range and implications for land managers. The University of Toledo, United States, Ohio.

Articles
 Bock CE & Bock JH. (1987). Avian Habitat Occupancy Following Fire in a Montana USA Shrubsteppe. Prairie Naturalist. vol 19, no 3. pp. 153–158.
 Bock CE & Bock JH. (1992). Response of Birds to Wildfire in Native Versus Exotic Arizona Grassland. Southwestern Naturalist. vol 37, no 1. pp. 73–81.
 Bolger DT, Scott TA & Rotenberry JT. (1997). Breeding bird abundance in an urbanizing landscape in coastal Southern California. Conservation Biology. vol 11, no 2. pp. 406–421.
 Brush SW & Ferguson GW. (1986). Predation of Lark Sparrow Chondestes-Grammacus Eggs by a Massasauga Rattlesnake Sistrurus-Catenatus. Southwestern Naturalist. vol 31, no 2. pp. 260–261.
 Campbell RW. (1973). Lark Sparrow on Vancouver Island. Canadian Field-Naturalist. vol 87, no 4. pp. 471–472.
 Carson RJ & Spicer GS. (2003). A phylogenetic analysis of the emberizid sparrows based on three mitochondrial genes. Molecular Phylogenetics & Evolution. vol 29, no 1. pp. 43–57.
 Charlton TD. (1995). Lark Sparrow in Suffolk: New to the western Palearctic. British Birds. vol 88, no 9. pp. 395–400.
 Crowell DK, Carpenter CC & Huffman DG. (1982). Nest Sharing by a Lark Sparrow Chandestes-Grammacus. Auk. vol 99, no 3. pp. 591–592.
 Davis MA, Peterson DW, Reich PB, Crozier M, Query T, Mitchell E, Huntington J & Bazakas P. (2000). Restoring savanna using fire: Impact on the breeding bird community. Restoration Ecology. vol 8, no 1. pp. 30–40.
 Fink LC. (1969). Lark Sparrow in Atlanta. Oriole. vol 34, no 4.
 Flanders AA, Kuvlesky WP, Jr., Ruthven DC, III, Zaiglin RE, Bingham RL, Fulbright TE, Hernandez F & Brennan LA. (2006). Effects of invasive exotic grasses on South Texas rangeland breeding birds. Auk. vol 123, no 1. pp. 171–182.
 Fortin MJ, Keitt TH, Maurer BA, Taper ML, Kaufman DM & Blackburn TM. (2005). Species' geographic ranges and distributional limits: pattern analysis and statistical issues. Oikos. vol 108, no 1. pp. 7–17.
 Grantham J. (1976). Lark Sparrow Sightings at Island Beach State Park. Cassinia. vol 56, pp. 26–27.
 Haire SL, Bock CE, Cade BS & Bennett BC. (2000). The role of landscape and habitat characteristics in limiting abundance of grassland nesting songbirds in an urban open space. Landscape & Urban Planning. vol 48, no 1–2. pp. 65–82.
 Hill RA. (1976). Host Parasite Relationships of the Brown-Headed Cowbird in a Prairie Habitat of West Central Kansas USA. Wilson Bulletin. vol 88, no 4. pp. 555–565.
 Houston CS & Houston MI. (2001). Slow northward spread of the Lark Sparrow. Blue Jay. vol 59, no 1. pp. 40–42.
 Lusk JJ, Wells KS, Guthery FS & Fuhlendorf SD. (2003). Lark Sparrow (Chondestes grammacus) nest-site selection and success in a mixed-grass prairie. Auk. vol 120, no 1. pp. 120–129.
 McNair DB. (1984). Reuse of Other Species Nests by Lark Sparrows Chondestes-Grammacus. Southwestern Naturalist. vol 29, no 4. pp. 506–509.
 McNair DB. (1985). A Comparison of Oology and Nest Record Card Data in Evaluating the Reproductive Biology of Lark Sparrows Chondestes-Grammacus. Southwestern Naturalist. vol 30, no 2. pp. 213–224.
 Peer BD, Robinson SK & Herkert JR. (2000). Egg rejection by cowbird hosts in grasslands. Auk. vol 117, no 4. pp. 892–901.
 Renwald JD. (1977). Effect of Fire on Lark Sparrow Nesting Densities. Journal of Range Management. vol 30, no 4. pp. 283–285.
 Rowland MM, Wisdom MJ, Suring LH & Meinke CW. (2006). Greater sage-grouse as an umbrella species for sagebrush-associated vertebrates. Biological Conservation. vol 129, no 3. pp. 323–335.
 Schuler CA, Rickard WH & Sargeant GA. (1993). Conservation of Habitats for Shrubsteppe Birds. Environmental Conservation. vol 20, no 1. pp. 57–64.
 Suedkamp Wells KM & Fuhlendorf SD. (2005). Comparison of microclimate at grassland bird nests with different substrates. Prairie Naturalist. vol 37, no 1. pp. 21–28.
 Swanson DA. (1996). Nesting ecology and nesting habitat requirements of Ohio's grassland-nesting birds: A literature review. Ohio Fish & Wildlife Report. vol 0, no 13. pp. 3–60.
 Vega JH & Rappole JH. (1994). Effects of scrub mechanical treatment on the nongame bird community in the Rio Grande Plain of Texas. Wildlife Society Bulletin. vol 22, no 2. pp. 165–171.
 Walters J. (1977). Lark Sparrow in Ontario County. Kingbird. vol 27, no 2.
 Williams MD. (1972). Eastern Ridge and Valley Region a Lark Sparrow Nest. Migrant. vol 43, no 3. pp. 78–80.

External links

 Lark sparrow species account - Cornell Lab of Ornithology
 Lark sparrow - Chondestes grammacus - USGS Patuxent Bird Identification InfoCenter
 
 
 

lark sparrow
American sparrows
Birds of North America
Native birds of the Canadian Prairies
Birds of the United States
lark sparrow
lark sparrow